Protosuchia is a group of extinct Mesozoic crocodyliforms. They were small in size (~1 meter in length) and terrestrial. In phylogenetic terms, Protosuchia is considered an informal group because it is a grade of basal crocodyliforms, not a true clade.

Classification
Recent phylogenetic analyses have not supported Protosuchia as a natural group. However, two studies found a clade of Late Triassic-Early Jurassic animals:

Edentosuchus
Hemiprotosuchus
Orthosuchus
Protosuchus

Both of these studies also found a clade more closely related to Hsisosuchus and Mesoeucrocodylia consisting of Late Jurassic-Late Cretaceous genera:

Neuquensuchus
Shantungosuchus
Sichuanosuchus
Zosuchus

However, other possible protosuchians from the Late Cretaceous of China-Mongolia, the Gobiosuchidae (Gobiosuchus and Zaraasuchus), have been found to be either intermediate between these two clades, or members of the Sichuanosuchus clade. There is also another family of Late Jurassic-Late Cretaceous genera, the Shartegosuchidae (e.g. Kyasuchus, Shartegosuchus and Nominosuchus).

Below is a cladogram from Fiorelli and Calvo (2007). Protosuchians are marked by the green bracket.

References

Terrestrial crocodylomorphs
Triassic crocodylomorpha
Jurassic crocodylomorphs
Early Cretaceous crocodylomorphs
Late Cretaceous crocodylomorphs
Late Triassic first appearances
Late Cretaceous extinctions
Paraphyletic groups